Chi Hyun-jung (born ) is a South Korean former competitive figure skater.  She competed at the 1987 World Championships and 1988 World Championships.

Following her retirement from competitive skating, she became a coach and choreographer.

Coaching career
Chi's current and former students include:

Shin Yea-ji
Yuna Kim
Young You
Kim Min-seok
Park So-youn
Lee June-hyoung
Choi Da-bin
Byun Se-jong
Park Sung-hoon
An Geon-hyeong
An So-hyun
Park Se-bin
Lim Eun-soo
Lee Hae-in
Cha Jun-hwan

Competitive highlights

References

1971 births
Living people
South Korean female single skaters
Figure skating coaches